The Mainichi Film Award for Best Supporting Actress is a film award given at the Mainichi Film Awards.

Award Winners

References

Film awards for supporting actress
Supporting Actress
Awards established in 1951
1951 establishments in Japan
Lists of films by award